Maika Ruyter-Hooley (born 4 December 1987) is an Australian football (soccer) player, who last played for Melbourne Victory in the Australian W-League.

References

1987 births
Living people
Australian women's soccer players
Melbourne Victory FC players
Women's association football defenders